Al-Kut Olympic Stadium (Arabic: ملعب الكوت الأولمبي) is a multi-purpose stadium in Al Kut, Iraq. It is currently used mostly for football matches and also has facilities for athletics. The stadium has an official capacity of 20,000.

It was officially inaugurated on 28July 2018 with a football match between Al-Kut SC and Al-Mosul FC.

The stadium hosted the 2019 Iraqi Super Cup on 14September 2019 between Al-Zawraa SC and Al-Shorta SC. The latter won the competition for the first time in its history by winning on penalties (4-3) after the match ended 1-1. That match, the stadium's stands were sold out despite the fact that both teams hail from Baghdad (177 km from Al Kut).

History 

Construction was launched in 2013 under the leadership of Iraqi Al Karama Company, which is affiliated to the Ministry of Industry and Minerals. Five years later, due to slowdowns and delays in project delivery, it was agreed to assign the contract to the Italian-Swedish company Sport System to finalise construction in 8 months. This allowed the work to be fully completed and the project to be inaugurated in 2018.

See also 
List of football stadiums in Iraq
2019 Iraqi Super Cup

References

Football venues in Iraq
Multi-purpose stadiums in Iraq
Athletics (track and field) venues in Iraq
Sports venues completed in 2018
2018 establishments in Iraq